Nausinoe perspectata is a moth in the family Crambidae. It was described by Johan Christian Fabricius in 1775. It is found in the Democratic Republic of the Congo, China, India, New Guinea, Sri Lanka, Taiwan and Australia.

The larvae feed on Jasminum sambac and Clematis leschenaultiana.

References

Moths described in 1775
Spilomelinae
Taxa named by Johan Christian Fabricius